Byron Smith (born 5 March 1984) is an English-born professional rugby league footballer for the Batley Bulldogs in National League One. He has previously played for the Castleford Tigers in the Super League, and Halifax (Heritage No. 1182). He is a Wales international.

Background
Byron Smith was born in Halifax, West Yorkshire, England.

International honours
Byron Smith won caps for Wales while at Castleford, and Rochdale Hornets 2005...2007. He also played for Wales in their 2014 European Cup campaign. (4 apps, 0 points)

References

External links
Profile at batleybulldogs.co.uk
(archived by web.archive.org) Statistics at slstats.org

1984 births
Living people
Batley Bulldogs players
Castleford Tigers players
Dewsbury Rams players
English people of Welsh descent
English rugby league players
Halifax R.L.F.C. players
Rochdale Hornets players
Rugby league players from Halifax, West Yorkshire
Rugby league props
Wales national rugby league team players
Rugby articles needing expert attention